Princeton is a census-designated place in Latah County, Idaho, United States.

Description
Princeton has a post office with ZIP code 83857. As of the 2010 census, its population was 148.

History
A post office called Princeton has been in operation since 1894. The community was named after Princeton, Minnesota, the native home of an early settler.

Demographics

See also

 List of census-designated places in Idaho

References

External links

Census-designated places in Latah County, Idaho
Census-designated places in Idaho